William F. Renwick (December 30, 1915 – February 28, 1981) is a former Democratic member of the Pennsylvania House of Representatives.

References

Democratic Party members of the Pennsylvania House of Representatives
1915 births
1981 deaths
20th-century American politicians
People from St. Marys, Pennsylvania